Michael John Morley (born 18 May 1957) is a British banker who succeeded Sarah Deaves as the Chief Executive Officer of Coutts & Co, the UK Private Bank, from May 2009 until March 2016.

Early life and education
Morley was educated at Merchant Taylors' School in Northwood, London followed by Cambridge University where he studied Modern and Medieval Languages at Christ's College.

Career
Morley's first senior management position was as CEO of Barclays Bank (Suisse) SA in Geneva from 2002-2007. He had spent the previous 8 years at Merrill Lynch in London where he was Head of the UK Private Client business and MD of the Ultra High Net Worth business in Europe, Middle East and Africa. He spent a year as MD of Singer and Friedlander Asset Investment Management before being appointed as CEO of Coutts in May 2009.

The position of CEO, originally MD, of Coutts & Co - which traces its history back to 1692, was originally created for Sir David Money-Coutts who held the post from 1970-1986. Previous holders of the position have been: Julian Robarts (1986-1991); Ian Farnsworth (1992-1995); Hershel Post (1995-2000); Andrew Fisher (2000-2002); Gordon Pell (2002-2005); and Sarah Deaves (2005-2009).

In 2009 he joined the Board of Adam & Company, a private bank headquartered in Edinburgh, Scotland and in 2010 he was appointed as Chairman of the Royal Bank of Scotland International business, headquartered in Jersey.

In 2014 he was appointed to the Board of Walpole British Luxury, a community dedicated to the promotion and development of British Luxury brands around the world.

In 2014 at the Sanya Forum in Huinan, China he was appointed to the China Advisory Council of the Judge Business School, University of Cambridge.

In 2015 he was appointed to the Board of the Wealth Management Association which represents the investment community in the UK.

He is an international fellow of the Duke of Edinburgh's Award and a Trustee and Director of the Forces in Mind Trust, a charity dedicated to enabling ex-service personnel and their families to lead successful civilian lives.

Personal life
Morley and his wife Conchita met whilst working in Geneva in the 1980s whilst they were both working at Lloyds Bank International. They have two sons.

References

British bankers
Living people
1957 births